Nataliya Sherstneva  (born 3 March 1973) is a Ukrainian freestyle skier. She was born in Mykolaiv. She competed at the 1994 Winter Olympics in Lillehammer, where she placed fifth in women's aerials.

References

External links 
 

1973 births
Sportspeople from Mykolaiv
Living people
Ukrainian female freestyle skiers
Olympic freestyle skiers of Ukraine
Freestyle skiers at the 1994 Winter Olympics